Rainou of Sabran (c. 1155 - 1224) (also Rainon II or Rénier II) was the Count of Forcalquier, Lord of Caylar and Ansouis, and a member of the noble House of Sabran. His father was Rostaing of Sabran and his mother was Rosca of Uzès.

He married Garsenda de Forcalquier († before 1193), daughter of Guillaume Comte of Forcalquier and Beatrice of Forcalquier.

Their daughter, Garsenda II, married Alfonso II of Provence in 1193.

References

Sources 

1150s births
1224 deaths
House of Sabran